The German People's Party was a political party in the Weimar Republic, and existed between 1918 and 1933.

German People's Party may also refer to:

German People's Party (1868), which existed in Germany between 1868 and 1910
German People's Party (Austria), which existed in Austria in the early twentieth century
German People's Party (Romania), which existed in Romania between 1935 and 1938